This article contains information about the literary events and publications of 2008.

Events
January 1 – In the UK's 2008 New Year Honours List, Hanif Kureishi (CBE), Jenny Uglow (OBE), Peter Vansittart (OBE) and Debjani Chatterjee (MBE) are all rewarded for "services to literature."
February 29 – Belgian-born "Misha Defonseca" admits that her bestselling Misha: A Mémoire of the Holocaust Years (1997) is a literary forgery.
April – Signet Books announce they will cease to publish the American historical romance novelist Cassie Edwards after a dispute over plagiarism.
April 25 – The first Twitter novel, Small Places by Nicholas Belardes, is launched.
May 7–11 – The first Palestine Festival of Literature is held.
June 15 – Gore Vidal, asked in a New York Times interview how he felt about the death of his rival William F. Buckley, Jr., replies: "I thought hell is bound to be a livelier place, as he joins forever those whom he served in life, applauding their prejudices and fanning their hatred."
July – Salman Rushdie's Midnight's Children (1981) is the winner of a poll to select the "Best of the Booker".

New books

Fiction
Aravind Adiga
The White Tiger 
Between the Assassinations (November 1)
Uwem Akpan – Say You're One of Them
Paul Auster – Man in the Dark
Sebastian Barry – The Secret Scripture (September 29)
Henry Bauchau – Le Boulevard périphérique
John Berger – From A to X
Charles Bock – Beautiful Children (January 22)
Roberto Bolaño – 2666: A Novel (November 11)
Xurxo Borrazás – Costa norte/ZFK
Christopher Buckley – Supreme Courtship (September 3)
Alastair Campbell – All in the Mind (October 30)
Martín Caparrós – A quien corresponda
Eleanor Catton – The Rehearsal
Wendy Coakley-Thompson – Triptych (December 18)
Robert Crais – Chasing Darkness
Debra Dean – Confessions of a Falling Woman
Klaus Ebner – Hominid (October 1)
Ralph Ellison (posthumous, ed. John F. Callahan) – Three Days Before the Shooting...
Mathias Énard – Zone (August 15)
Sebastian Faulks – Devil May Care (James Bond continuation novel)
Keith Gessen – All the Sad Young Literary Men (April 10)
Shanta Gokhale – Tyā varshī (Crowfall)
Juan Goytisolo – Exiled from Almost Everywhere
Paul Griffiths – let me tell you
Lauren Groff – The Monsters of Templeton (February 5)
Peter Handke – The Moravian Night (January 12, Germany)
Johan Harstad – DARLAH
Zoë Heller – The Believers (September 24)
Aleksandar Hemon – The Lazarus Project (May 1)
M. H. Herlong – The Great Wide Sea (October 2)
Samantha Hunt – The Invention of Everything Else (February 7)
Siri Hustvedt – The Sorrows of an American (April 1)
Karl Iagnemma – The Expeditions (January 15)
Robert Juan-Cantavella – El Dorado
Jack Kerouac and William S. Burroughs (posthumous) – And the Hippos Were Boiled in Their Tanks (November 1; written 1945)
Christian Kracht – Ich werde hier sein im Sonnenschein und im Schatten (September)
László Krasznahorkai – Seiobo There Below
Jhumpa Lahiri – Unaccustomed Earth (April 1)
Paul Laurendeau – Femmes fantastiques
Kelly Link – Pretty Monsters (October 2)
David Lodge – Deaf Sentence (May 1)
James McBride – Song Yet Sung (February 5)
Joe McGinniss Jr. – The Delivery Man (January 15)
Ronit Matalon – The Sound of Our Steps  (Kol Tsa'adenu)
Lydia Millet – How the Dead Dream (January 25)
Toni Morrison – A Mercy (November 11)
Nunoe Mura – GeGeGe no Nyōbō (ゲゲゲの女房)
Joyce Carol Oates – My Sister, My Love (June 24)
Sofi Oksanen – Puhdistus
Chuck Palahniuk – Snuff (May 20)
Arturo Perez-Reverte – The Painter of Battles (January 8)
Jodi Picoult – Change of Heart (March 4)
José Luis Rodríguez Pittí – Sueños urbanos
Richard Price – Lush Life (March 4)
Ruth Rendell – Portobello (November 20)
Nina Revoyr – The Age of Dreaming
Nathaniel Rich – The Mayor's Tongue (April 8)
Marilynne Robinson – Home (September 2)
Charlotte Roche – Feuchtgebiete (February 25)
Mary Ann Rodman – Jimmy's Stars
Philip Roth – Indignation (September 16)
Salman Rushdie – The Enchantress of Florence (June 3)
Will Self – The Butt
Curtis Sittenfeld – American Wife (September 2)
Sjón – Rökkurbýsnir
Elizabeth Strout – Olive Kitteridge (March 25)
Tom Rob Smith – Child 44
Joan Thomas – Reading by Lightning
David Turashvili – Flight from the USSR
John Updike – The Widows of Eastwick (October 28)
Tobias Wolff – Our Story Begins (March 25)

Genre fiction
Jim Butcher – Small Favor (April 1) (Harry Dresden #10)
Matthew J. Costello – Doom 3: Worlds on Fire (February 26)
Ursula K. Le Guin – Lavinia
Stephen King – Duma Key (January 22)
Patricia A. McKillip – The Bell at Sealey Head (September 2)
Stephenie Meyer – Breaking Dawn (August 2)
Douglas Preston – Blasphemy (January 8)
Matthew Stover – Caine Black Knife (October 14)
Brent Weeks – The Way of Shadows

Children and young people
David Almond
The Savage
Jackdaw Summer
Dave Barry and Ridley Pearson – Science Fair
Nick Bland – The Very Cranky Bear
Eoin Colfer – Artemis Fowl: The Time Paradox (July 15)
Frank Cottrell-Boyce – Desirable
Suzanne Collins – The Hunger Games (September 14)
John Fardell – Manfred the Baddie
Mem Fox – Ten Little Fingers and Ten Little Toes
Cornelia Funke – Inkdeath (October 7)
John Green – Paper Towns (October 16)
Brian Greene – Icarus At The Edge Of Time
Charlie Higson – Young Bond: By Royal Command (September 3)
Minoru Kawakami and Satoyasu – Horizon on the Middle of Nowhere
D. J. MacHale – Raven Rise (May 20)
Patricia Martin - Lulu Atlantis and the Quest for True Blue Love (January 8)
Jenny Nimmo – Charlie Bone and the Shadow of Badlock (June 1)
Garth Nix – Superior Saturday (May 5)
Arielle North Olson – More Bones: Scary Stories From Around The World
Christopher Paolini – Brisingr (September 20)
Rick Riordan – The Maze of Bones
Angie Sage – Queste (April 8)
Michael Salzhauer – My Beautiful Mommy

Drama
Salvatore Antonio – In Gabriel's Kitchen
Howard Brenton – Never So Good
Mary Higgins Clark – Where Are You Now?
Paul Dwyer – The Bougainville Photoplay Project
Nicholas de Jongh – Plague Over England
Johan Heldenbergh and Mieke Dobbels – The Broken Circle Breakdown featuring the cover-ups of Alabama
Ella Hickson – Eight
Sam Holcroft – Cockroach
Elaine Murphy – Little Gem
Lynn Nottage – Ruined
Tyler Perry – The Marriage Counselor
Taavi Vartia – Kaikkien aikojen Pertsa ja Kilu

Poetry

Non-fiction
The Academi – Encyclopaedia of Wales (Gwyddoniadur Cymru) (January)
Julie Andrews – Home: A Memoir of My Early Years (April 1)
Kwame Anthony Appiah – Experiments in Ethics
Dan Ariely – Predictably Irrational (February 19)
Margaret Atwood – Payback: Debt and the Shadow Side of Wealth (October 1)
Mary Beard – Pompeii: The Life of a Roman Town
Dionne Brand – A Kind of Perfect Speech (Ralph Gustafson Lecture)
Augusten Burroughs – A Wolf at the Table (April 29)
Michael Chabon – Maps and Legends (May 1)
D. K. Chakrabarti – The Battle for Ancient India: An essay in the sociopolitics of Indian archaeology
Sloane Crosley – I Was Told There'd Be Cake (April 1)
John Duignan – The Complex: An Insider Exposes the Covert World of the Church of Scientology (October 7)
Eminem – The Way I Am (October 21)
Richard Florida – Who's Your City? (March)
Raymond Geuss – Philosophy and Real Politics
Philip Hoare – Leviathan, or The Whale (September 16)
Chloe Hooper – The Tall Man: Death and Life on Palm Island
B. B. Lal – Rāma, His Historicity, Mandir, and Setu: Evidence of Literature, Archaeology, and Other Sciences
Minae Mizumura – The Fall of Language in the Age of English
Scholastique Mukasonga – La femme aux pieds nus (The Barefoot Woman)
Haruki Murakami (translated by Philip Gabriel) – What I Talk About When I Talk About Running (July 29)
Shuja Nawaz – Crossed Swords: Pakistan, Its Army, and the Wars Within
Frances Osborne – The Bolter: Idina Sackville
Chris Pash – The Last Whale
Peter Rees – The Other ANZACs
David Sedaris – When You Are Engulfed in Flames (June 3)
Vaclav Smil – Energy in Nature and Society: General Energetics of Complex Systems
Chunghee Sarah Soh – The Comfort Women: Sexual Violence and Postcolonial Memory in Korea and Japan
Kate Summerscale – The Suspicions of Mr. Whicher, or The Murder at Road Hill House (April)
Ronnie Thompson (pseudonym) – Screwed: The Truth About Life as a Prison Officer (January 24)
Bjørn Christian Tørrissen – One for the Road (January 31; translation of I pose og sekk!, 2005)
Barbara Walters – Audition: A Memoir (May 6)
Russell Wangersky – Burning Down the House: Fighting Fires and Losing Myself
Meralda Warren and others – Mi Base side orn Pitcairn (My Favourite Place on Pitcairn, first book published in Pitkern creole)
Dagmar S. Wodtko, Britta Irslinger and Carolin Schneider (eds.) – Nomina im Indogermanischen Lexikon
Jim Holt – Stop Me If You've Heard This: A History and Philosophy of Jokes
Thomas Cairns Livingstone – Tommy's War: A First World War Diary 1913–1918

Deaths

January 2 – George MacDonald Fraser, Scottish novelist and screenplay writer (born 1925)
January 3 – Henri Chopin, French poet (born 1922)
January 11 – Nancy Phelan, Australian writer (born 1913)
January 13 – Patricia Verdugo, Chilean journalist and writer (born 1947)
January 16 – Hone Tuwhare, New Zealand poet (born 1922)
January 17 – Edward D. Hoch, American detective fiction writer (born 1930)
January 26
John Ardagh, Nyasaland-born English journalist and writer (born 1928)
Abraham Brumberg, American writer and editor (born 1926)
January 29 – Margaret Truman, American crime novelist and singer (born 1924)
January 30 – Miles Kington, Northern Irish-born English journalist and writer (born 1941)

February 4 – Rose Hacker, English writer and journalist (born 1906)
February 7 – Richard Altick, American literary historian (born 1915)
February 8 – Phyllis A. Whitney, Japan-born American mystery writer (born 1903)
February 10 – Steve Gerber, American comic book writer (born 1947)
February 18 – Alain Robbe-Grillet, French novelist (born 1922)
February 21
Archie Hind, Scottish novelist (born 1928)
Robin Moore, American novelist and memoirist (born 1925)
February 22 – Stephen Marlowe, American science fiction and crime writer (born 1928)
February 28 – Julian Rathbone, English novelist (born 1935)
February 29 – Val Plumwood (Val Routley), Australian philosopher (born 1939)

March 16 – Jonathan Williams, American poet (born 1929)
March 19
Arthur C. Clarke, English science fiction writer and futurologist (born 1917)
Hugo Claus, Belgian writer in Flemish and English (born 1929)
March 23 – E. A. Markham, Montserrat poet, writer and activist (born 1939)
April 3 – Andrew Crozier, English poet and scholar (born 1943)
April 7 – Ludu Daw Amar, Burmese writer and journalist (born 1915)
April 13 – Robert Greacen, Irish poet (born 1920)
April 17
Aimé Césaire, Martinique poet and writer in French (born 1913)
Zoya Krakhmalnikova, Russian writer and editor (born 1929)
April 18
Michael de Larrabeiti, English young-adult novelist and travel writer (born 1934)
William W. Warner, American biologist and Pulitzer Prize writer (born 1920)
May 1 – Elaine Dundy, American novelist, biographer and playwright (born 1921)
May 9 – Nuala O'Faolain, Irish critic and writer (born 1940)
May 11 – Jeff Torrington, Scottish novelist (born 1935)
May 12 – Oakley Hall, American novelist (born 1920)
May 14 – Roy Heath, Guyanese novelist (born 1926)
May 15 – Muhyi al-Din Faris,  Sudanese poet (born 1936)
May 19 – Vijay Tendulkar, Indian playwright (born 1928)
May 22 – Robert Asprin, American science fiction writer (born 1946)
May 23 – Alan Brien, English journalist and novelist (born 1925)
May 28 – Elinor Lyon, British children's writer (born 1921)

June 2 – Ferenc Fejtő, Hungarian-born French historian and journalist (born 1909)
June 4 – Matthew Bruccoli, American biographer and scholar (born 1931)
June 5 – Angus Calder, British writer and scholar (born 1942)
June 8 – Peter Rühmkorf, German poet and writer (born 1929)
June 9 – Algis Budrys (John A. Sentry), American science fiction writer of Lithuanian origin (born 1931)
June 10
Chinghiz Aitmatov, Kyrgyz writer in Kyrgyz and Russian (born 1928)
Eliot Asinof, American novelist and baseball writer (born 1919)
June 16 – Mario Rigoni Stern, Italian novelist (born 1921)
June 18 – Tasha Tudor, American children's writer and illustrator (born 1915)
June 22 – Albert Cossery, Egyptian-born French novelist (born 1913)
June 24 – Ruth Cardoso, Brazilian anthropologist and writer (born 1930)
June 25 – Lyall Watson, South African scientist and new age writer (born 1939)
June 27 – Lenka Reinerová, Czech writer in German (born 1916)

July 1
Clay Felker, American magazine editor and journalist (born 1925)
Robert Harling, English typographer and novelist (born 1910)
July 2 – Simone Ortega, Spanish cookery writer (born 1919)
July 4
Thomas M. Disch, American science fiction author and poet. (born 1940)
Janwillem van de Wetering, Dutch novelist and writer in Dutch and English (born 1931)
July 20 – Roger Wolcott Hall, American memoirist and novelist (born 1919)
July 27 – Bob Crampsey, Scottish writer (born 1930)
July 30 – Peter Coke, English playwright (born 1913)

August 3 – Aleksandr Solzhenitsyn, Russian writer and Nobel laureate (born 1918)
August 7 – Simon Gray, English playwright and memoirist (born 1936)
August 9 – Mahmoud Darwish, Palestinian poet (born 1942)
August 11 – George Furth, American playwright (born 1932)
August 17 – Dave Freeman, American writer and advertising executive (born 1961)
August 23 – John Russell, English art critic (born 1919)
August 25 – Ahmed Faraz (Syed Akhmad Shah), Pakistani poet in Urdu (born 1931)
August 31 – Ken Campbell, English novelist and playwright (born 1941)

September 5 – Robert Giroux, American editor and publisher (born 1914)
September 7 – Gregory Mcdonald, American mystery writer (born 1937)
September 12 – David Foster Wallace, American novelist (born 1962)
September 17 – James Crumley, American crime writer (born 1939)
September 20 – Duncan Glen, Scottish poet, critic and literary historian (born 1933)
September 23 – William Woodruff, English historian and autobiographer (born 1916)
September 24 – Bengt Anderberg, Swedish poet, novelist and children's writer (born 1920)
September 29 – Hayden Carruth, American poet and literary critic (born 1921)
October 4 – Peter Vansittart, English novelist and historical writer (born 1920)
October 14 – Barrington J. Bayley, English science fiction writer (born 1937)
October 26 – Tony Hillerman, American mystery writer (born 1925)
October 27 – Es'kia Mphahlele, South African writer in English (born 1919)
October 29 – William Wharton (Albert William Du Aime), American novelist (born 1925)
October 31 – Studs Terkel, American historian and broadcaster (born 1912)
November 4 – Michael Crichton, American writer and scholar (born 1942)
November 13 – Jules Archer, American historian and author (born 1915)
November 14 – Kristin Hunter, American author and academic (born 1931)
December 1 – Dorothy Sterling, American non-fiction writer for children and historian (born 1913)
December 4 – Forrest J Ackerman, American magazine editor, science fiction writer, and literary agent (born 1916)
December 15 – Anne-Catharina Vestly, Norwegian children's book author (born 1920)
December 20 – Adrian Mitchell, English poet, playwright and fiction writer (born 1932)
December 24 – Harold Pinter, English playwright and screenwriter (born 1930)  
December 31 – Donald E. Westlake, American novelist (born 1933)

Awards and honors
Camões Prize: João Ubaldo Ribeiro
Europe Theatre Prize: Patrice Chéreau
European Book Prize: Tony Judt, Postwar
International Dublin Literary Award: Rawi Hage, De Niro's Game
International Prize for Arabic Fiction: Bahaa Taher, Sunset Oasis
Nobel Prize in Literature: J. M. G. Le Clézio

Australia
Miles Franklin Award: Steven Carroll, The Time We Have Taken

Canada
Canada Reads: Paul Quarrington, King Leary
Dayne Ogilvie Prize: Main award, Zoe Whittall; honours of distinction, Brian Francis, John Miller.
Edna Staebler Award for Creative Non-Fiction: Bruce Serafin, Stardust
Governor General's Awards: Multiple categories; see 2008 Governor General's Awards.
Hilary Weston Writers' Trust Prize for Nonfiction: Taras Grescoe, Bottomfeeder: How to Eat Ethically in a World of Vanishing Seafood
Rogers Writers' Trust Fiction Prize: Miriam Toews, The Flying Troutmans
Scotiabank Giller Prize: Joseph Boyden, Through Black Spruce
Writers' Trust Engel/Findley Award: Michael Winter

Sweden
Astrid Lindgren Memorial Award: Sonya Hartnett

United Kingdom
Bookseller/Diagram Prize for Oddest Title of the Year: The 2009-2014 World Outlook for 60-milligram Containers of Fromage Frais, Philip M. Parker
Caine Prize for African Writing: Henrietta Rose-Innes, "Poison"
Carnegie Medal for children's literature: Philip Reeve, Here Lies Arthur
Man Booker Prize: Aravind Adiga, The White Tiger
Orange Broadband Prize for Fiction: to The Road Home by Rose Tremain

United States
Lambda Literary Awards: Multiple categories; see 2008 Lambda Literary Awards.
National Book Award for Fiction: to Shadow Country by Peter Matthiessen
National Book Critics Circle Award: to 2666 by Roberto Bolaño
Newbery Medal for children's literature: Laura Amy Schlitz, Good Masters! Sweet Ladies! Voices from a Medieval Village
PEN/Faulkner Award for Fiction: Kate Christensen, The Great Man
Pulitzer Prize for Fiction: Junot Diaz, The Brief and Wondrous Life of Oscar Wao
Whiting Awards:
Fiction: Mischa Berlinski, Laleh Khadivi, Manuel Muñoz, Benjamin Percy, Lysley Tenorio
Nonfiction: Donovan Hohn
Plays: Dael Orlandersmith
Poetry: Rick Hilles, Douglas Kearney, Julie Sheehan

Other
Premio de la Crítica de Galicia (category Ensayo y Pensamiento): Xurxo Borrazás, Arte e parte

Notes

References

See also
List of literary awards
List of poetry awards
2008 in comics
2008 in Australian literature

Literature

 
Years of the 21st century in literature